Yeşilkonak is a village in the Kurtalan District of Siirt Province in Turkey. The village is populated by Kurds of non-tribal affiliation and had a population of 225 in 2021.

The hamlet of Mağralı is attached to the village.

References 

Kurdish settlements in Siirt Province
Villages in Kurtalan District